Absolute Greatest: 40 Years True Blue is a career spanning greatest hits album by Australian country music artist John Williamson. The album is divided into 2 discs; the first titled "Absolute Greatest" and the second "Absolute Tribute" and features 13 of Williamson's tracks recorded by other artists. The album was released in Australian in March 2010.

The album featured the a new single "Island of Oceans" with Shannon Noll. About the track Williamson said: “I have written many songs over my forty years as a recording artist in an attempt to capture the enormous spiritual power of our huge, ancient land. At last, here it is; an anthem aimed to inspire pride in our place on earth. My final song on the subject! Only time will tell whether I have succeeded.”

Reception
Lauren from Sound of Oz said "Greatest hits collections are never much of a drawcard for enthusiasts who've probably got all the big tracks at home already. The covers should attract those country diehards, while those who've never bought a John Williamson album can now get all the hits in one place."

Track listing

Charts

Weekly charts

Year-end charts

Release history

Certifications

References

2010 greatest hits albums
John Williamson (singer) compilation albums
EMI Records compilation albums